Claudia Hunt (born March 12, 1950 in Montreal) is a Canadian sprint canoer who competed in the late 1960s and early 1970s. Competing in two Summer Olympics, she was eliminated in the semifinals of the K-2 500 m event in both 1968 and 1972.

References
Sports-reference.com profile

1950 births
Canoeists from Montreal
Canadian female canoeists
Canoeists at the 1968 Summer Olympics
Canoeists at the 1972 Summer Olympics
Living people
Olympic canoeists of Canada